Maxwell may refer to:

People
 Maxwell (surname), including a list of people and fictional characters with the name
 James Clerk Maxwell, mathematician and physicist
 Justice Maxwell (disambiguation)
 Maxwell baronets, in the Baronetage of Nova Scotia
 Maxwell (footballer, born 1979), Brazilian forward
 Maxwell (footballer, born 1981), Brazilian left-back 
 Maxwell (footballer, born 1986), Brazilian striker
 Maxwell (footballer, born 1989), Brazilian left-back
 Maxwell (footballer, born 1995), Brazilian forward
 Maxwell (musician) (born 1973), American R&B and neo-soul singer
 Maxwell (rapper) (born 1993), German rapper, member of rap band 187 Strassenbande
 Maxwell Jacob Friedman (born 1997) AEW Professional wrestler
 Maxwell Silva (born 1953), Sri Lankan Sinhala Catholic cleric, Auxiliary Bishop of Colombo

Places

United States 
 Maxwell, California
 Maxwell, Indiana
 Maxwell, Iowa
 Maxwell, Nebraska
 Maxwell, New Mexico
 Maxwell, Texas
 Maxwell Air Force Base, Alabama
 Maxwell Street, Chicago, Illinois
 Maxwell Township (disambiguation)

Elsewhere 
 Maxwell, Ontario (disambiguation), multiple locations in Canada
 Maxwell MRT station, in Singapore
 Maxwell Hill, in Perak, Malaysia
 Maxwelltown, Scotland
 Pākaraka, New Zealand, formerly known as Maxwell

In space 
 Maxwell (crater), on the Moon
 12760 Maxwell, a main-belt asteroid 
 Maxwell Montes, on Venus

Arts and entertainment 
 Maxwell (film), a 2007 film about Robert Maxwell
 Maxwell, an 1830 novel by Theodore Hook
 Maxwell the pig, in the GEICO commercials
Maxwell, the main protagonist of the Scribblenauts series
 Maxwell, the antagonist then turned protagonist of the Don't Starve series

Businesses and organisations
 Maxwell Motor Company, an American automobile manufacturer 1904–1925
 Maxwell Technologies, an American developer and manufacturer 

 Maxwell School, in Kuala Lumpur, Malaysia
 Maxwell School of Citizenship and Public Affairs, of Syracuse University, U.S.
 Maxwell International Bahá'í School, formerly in Shawnigan Lake, British Columbia, Canada
 William H. Maxwell Career and Technical Education High School, in Brooklyn, New York, U.S.
 Maxwell's, a bar/restaurant and music club in Hoboken, New Jersey, U.S.

Science and technology 
 Maxwell (microarchitecture), a graphics processor architecture developed by Nvidia
 Maxwell (unit), the cgs unit of magnetic flux
 Maxwell Render, 3D rendering engine software

Other uses 
 Maxwell (1804 ship), an American-built British merchant ship
 Maxwell Award, presented by the Maxwell Football Club for the American football College Player of the Year

See also
 
 Maxwell's equations, describing the behavior of electric and magnetic fields
 Maxwell relations, a set of equations in thermodynamics 
 Maxwell's theorem, in probability theory
 Maxwell's theorem (geometry)
 James Clerk Maxwell Telescope, on Mauna Kea, Hawaii
 Maxwell House (disambiguation)
 Maxell